Massadio Haïdara (born 2 December 1992) is a professional footballer who plays as a left-back for Ligue 1 club Lens. Born in France, he plays for the Mali national team.

Club career

Nancy
Haïdara made his professional debut on 11 December 2010 in a league match against Sochaux. On 10 January 2011, he signed his first professional contract after agreeing to a three-year deal with Nancy.

Newcastle United
On 25 January 2013, Haïdara signed for English club Newcastle United of the Premier League for an undisclosed fee (reportedly £2 million) to become Newcastle's ninth first-team player with French nationality and fourth of five French players signed in the January 2013 transfer window. He made his debut for Newcastle on 21 February 2013 in the Europa League against Metalist Kharkiv.

Haïdara came on as a first-half substitute in the match against Wigan Athletic on 17 March 2013. A few minutes later, he was stretchered off as a result of a knee-high tackle on him by Callum McManaman and taken to hospital; and returned to first-team action on 11 April against Benfica. Referee Mark Halsey did not see the incident, so McManaman received no card, and because one of his assistants did see it, albeit not clearly, the Football Association were unable to act. At the end of the season, their rules were changed to permit retrospective action "when match officials are not in a position to fully assess a 'coming together' of players."

He made his first league appearance of the 2016–17 season against Barnsley on 7 May 2017, the day that Newcastle clinched the Championship title. The following season he also had to wait until the final game of the season to make his first league appearance, this time against Chelsea.

Lens
In July 2018, after his contract with Newcastle United expired, Haïdara signed on a free transfer for French club RC Lens of the Ligue 2, the second-tier French league.

International career
Haïdara has represented France at U21 level. On 9 November 2018, he was called up to Mali national football team. He made his debut for Mali on 26 March 2019 in a friendly against Senegal, as a starter.

Career statistics

Club

International

Honours
Newcastle United
EFL Championship: 2016–17

References

External links

1992 births
Living people
People from Trappes
Footballers from Yvelines
French footballers
France youth international footballers
France under-21 international footballers
French expatriate sportspeople in England
French expatriate footballers
Citizens of Mali through descent
Malian footballers
Mali international footballers
Malian expatriate footballers
Expatriate footballers in England
Association football defenders
AS Nancy Lorraine players
Newcastle United F.C. players
RC Lens players
Ligue 1 players
Ligue 2 players
Premier League players
English Football League players
French sportspeople of Malian descent
2019 Africa Cup of Nations players
2021 Africa Cup of Nations players